Premik Russell Tubbs is an American saxophonist, songwriter, producer and multi-instrumentalist.

Career 
Since the 1970s he worked with a wide range of artists such as John McLaughlin, Narada Michael Walden, Jackson Browne, Carlos Santana, Jeff Beck, Yoko Oginome, Cecil McBee, George Duke, Stanley Clarke, Jaco Pastorius, Jean-Luc Ponty, T.M. Stevens, Wayne Shorter and many more. His saxophone was featured on hits like "How Will I Know", "Baby Come to Me and "We Don't Have to Take Our Clothes Off".

In 1983, Premik joined Lonnie Liston Smith's band, along with bass player Cecil McBee. Until 1985 he played the Montreux Jazz Festival and recorded two albums with them. From 1991 to 1994 he toured with Scarlet Rivera (Bob Dylan's violinist). They also opened shows for Spyro Gyra. The following years, he toured with jazz violinist Julie Lyonn Lieberman, Clara Ponty, Wendy Starland and in 2007 as a member of Radio Massacre International. In November 2011 he toured with Chandrika Tandon and Steve Gorn.

More recently he performed with Sting, Lady Gaga, Ravi & Anoushka Shankar. In April 2012, Premik was invited to perform at the Carnegie Hall in the Revlon Concert for the Rainforest Fund featuring Sting, Elton John, James Taylor, Meryl Streep, Jennifer Hudson, Bruno Mars, Katharine McPhee, Bryn Terfel, Rosanne Cash and Vince Gill.

Premik has recorded several world music records along with spiritual master Sri Chinmoy, Steve Booke and Shambhu Vineberg as well as music for different short films.

On April 17, 2014, he was part of the band for the "Rainforest Fund Benefit Concert", including performers Sting, Lady Gaga, Bruno Mars, Elton John, Tina Turner, Bruce Springsteen, Paul Simon, James Taylor, Diana Ross, Stevie Wonder, Billy Joel, Meryl Streep, Jennifer Hudson, Will Ferrell and many more. Premik is announced to play with the Royal Philharmonic Orchestra on April 25 in Croydon.

Discography 

 1974: Mahavishnu Orchestra – Visions of the Emerald Beyond
 1976: Narada Michael Walden – Garden of Love Light
 1977: Narada Michael Walden – I Cry, I Smile
 1980: Carlos Santana & Herbie Hancock – The Swing of Delight
 1984: Lonnie Liston Smith – Silhouettes
 1985: Lonnie Liston Smith – Rejuvenation
 1985: Clarence Clemons – Hero
 1985: Whitney Houston – Whitney Houston
 1986: Jermaine Stewart – Frantic Romantic
 1987: Whitney Houston – Whitney
 1989: Yoko Oginome – Verge of Love
 1989: Regina Belle – Stay with Me
 1989: Kid 'N Play – Face the Nation
 1992: Calverly – Avalon
 2001: Premik Russell Tubbs – Equinox
 2002: Ali Appel – Crooked Line
 2004: Premik Russell Tubbs – Mission-Transcendence
 2006: Gerald Jay Markoe – Celestial Music for Sitar
 2007: The Mahavishnu Project – Return to the Emerald Beyond
 2010: Premik Russell Tubbs & Steve Booke – Pratyavartana
 2011: Fiona Joy Hawkins – Christmas Joy
 2012: Fiona Joy Hawkins – Sensual Journeys
 2012: Ronnda Cadle – Will's Embrace
 2012: Dan Kennedy – Intuition
 2012: Heidi Anne Breyer – Beyong the Turning
 2012: Rebecca Harrold – The River of Life
 2013: Asher Barkin – Birchos Avicha
 2013: Shambhu – Dreaming of Now
 2014: Masako – Call of the Mountains

References

External links 
 PremikMusic.com Official Site
  All about Jazz
  Guo Flute
  IMDb
  Discogs

Year of birth missing (living people)
American saxophonists
American male saxophonists
Living people
Devotees of Sri Chinmoy
21st-century saxophonists